Hong Kong is a 26-episode adventure/drama series (plus an initial pilot episode) which aired on ABC television during the 1960–1961 season and helped to catapult Australian actor Rod Taylor into a major film star, primarily in the 1960s, beginning with his role in Alfred Hitchcock's The Birds. The series was a production of 20th Century Fox Television, and the final credit of each episode stated: "Filmed by Twentieth Century Fox Television Inc. at its Hollywood studios and in the Crown Colony of Hong Kong".

Synopsis
Hong Kong was set in the then British Crown Colony of Hong Kong. Taylor portrayed Glenn Evans, a U.S. journalist who worked in the exotic Far Eastern city. His search for stories led him into encounters with smugglers, murderers, drug peddlers, and mysterious women who would disappear behind beaded curtains. Taylor’s principal costars were Lloyd Bochner, who portrayed Chief Inspector Neil Campbell, and Jack Kruschen as Tully the bartender.

In the television series, Evans' residential address is often given as the fictitious 24 Peak Rd.  As shown in various episodes, the interior of Evans' bachelor apartment (actually a Hollywood set constructed on a  sound stage at 20th Century Fox Studios) includes a large, sliding-glass door which opens to a small patio with a sweeping vista that overlooks the harbor and distant peaks.  Evans' regular drive was a white Series 1 Sunbeam Alpine.

Hong Kong was loosely based on the film Soldier of Fortune, which had Michael Rennie in a police inspector role similar to Lloyd Bochner's. Kruschen appeared in the film as well, in a role different from the one he played in the series. The series premiered on Wednesday, September 28, 1960, and ceased new episodes on March 29, 1961; repeats continued until September 27.  Hong Kong ran opposite NBC’s Wagon Train, when midway in the season Ward Bond died in Dallas, and his trail boss character, Seth Adams, was succeeded without explanation by John McIntire as Chris Hale. CBS at the hour offered the short-lived The Aquanauts, renamed at mid-season as Malibu Run.

Cast

Main
 Rod Taylor as Glenn Evans
 Lloyd Bochner as Neil Campbell
 Harold Fong as Ahting
 Gerald Jann as Ling
 Jack Kruschen as Tully
 Mai Tai Sing as Ching Mei

Notable guest stars

 Robert Burton
 Robert Carricart
 Joan Caulfield
 Joanna Cook Moore
 Lawrence Dobkin
 Felicia Farr
 Rhonda Fleming
 Anne Francis
 Mario Gallo
 Beverly Garland
 Harry Holcombe
 James Hong
 Susan Kohner
 John Lasell
 Bethel Leslie
 Julie London
 Leon Lontoc
 Dina Merrill
 Jay Novello
 Peter Oliphant
 Joseph V. Perry
 Barney Phillips
 Suzanne Pleshette
 Sam Reese
 Gia Scala
 Pippa Scott
 Simon Scott
 Leonard Strong
 Elen Willard

Episodes

Reception
The show struggled in the ratings against Wagon Train and was cancelled after one season. However it proved popular in syndication and was the third most popular drama series on TV in Australia in 1961.

References

External links
  
1960 American television series debuts
1961 American television series endings
1960s American drama television series
American Broadcasting Company original programming
Television series by 20th Century Fox Television
American adventure television series